In the theory of many-particle systems, Jacobi coordinates often are used to simplify the mathematical formulation.  These coordinates are particularly common in treating polyatomic molecules and chemical reactions, and in celestial mechanics. An algorithm for generating the Jacobi coordinates for N bodies may be based upon binary trees. In words, the algorithm is described as follows:
Let mj and mk be the masses of two bodies that are replaced by a new body of virtual mass M = mj + mk. The position coordinates xj and xk are replaced by their relative position  rjk = xj − xk and by the vector to their center of mass Rjk = (mj qj + mkqk)/(mj +  mk). The node in the binary tree corresponding to the virtual body has mj as its right child and mk as its left child. The order of children indicates the relative coordinate points from xk to xj. Repeat the above step for N − 1 bodies, that is, the N − 2 original bodies plus the new virtual body. 

For the N-body problem the result is:

with

The result one is left with is thus a system of N-1 translationally invariant coordinates  and a center of mass coordinate , from iteratively reducing two-body systems within the many-body system.

If one is interested in evaluating a free energy operator in these coordinates, one obtains

In the calculations can be useful the following identity

.

References

Molecular vibration
Molecular geometry
Chemical reactions
Hamiltonian mechanics
Lagrangian mechanics
Coordinate systems
Orbits